In mathematics, a ribbon category, also called a tortile category, is a particular type of braided monoidal category.

Definition 
A monoidal category  is, loosely speaking, a category equipped with a notion resembling the tensor product (of vector spaces, say). That is, for any two objects , there is an object . The assignment  is supposed to be functorial and needs to require a number of further properties such as a unit object 1 and an associativity isomorphism. Such a category is called braided if there are isomorphisms

A braided monoidal category is called a ribbon category if the category is left rigid and has a family of twists. The former means that for each object  there is another object (called the left dual), with maps

such that the compositions

The twists are maps 
, 
such that

To be a ribbon category, the duals have to be thus compatible with the braiding and the twists.

Concrete Example 
Suppose that  is such a vector space, spanned by the basis vectors . We assign to  the dual object  spanned by the basis vectors . Then let us define

and its dual

(which largely amounts to assigning a given  the dual ).

Then indeed we find that (for example) 

Since this proof applies to any finite-dimensional vector space, we have shown that our structure over  defines a (left) rigid monoidal category. 

Then, we must define braids and twists in such a way that they are compatible. In this case, this largely makes one determined given the other on the reals. For example, if we take the trivial braiding

then , so our twist must obey . In other words it must operate elementwise across tensor products.

On the other hand, we can introduce any nonzero multiplicative factor into the above braiding rule without breaking isomorphism (at least in ). Let us for example take the braiding

Then . Since , then ; by induction, if  is -dimensional, then .

Other Examples 

 The category of projective modules over a commutative ring. In this category, the monoidal structure is the tensor product, the dual object is the dual in the sense of (linear) algebra, which is again projective. The twists in this case are the identity maps. 
 A more sophisticated example of a ribbon category are finite-dimensional representations of a quantum group.

The name ribbon category is motivated by a graphical depiction of morphisms.

Variant 

A strongly ribbon category is a ribbon category C equipped with a dagger structure such that the functor †: Cop → C coherently preserves the ribbon structure.

References 

 
  
 

Monoidal categories
Dagger categories